Secrets of Haunted House was a horror-suspense comics anthology series published by American company DC Comics from 1975 to 1978 and 1979 to 1982.

Publication history
The series began in April–May 1975. Like its predecessor Secrets of Sinister House, Secrets of Haunted House was originally "hosted" by Cain, Abel, Eve, and Destiny who had moved over from Weird Mystery Tales. By issue #10 (Feb.–March 1978), Destiny was the only one of these who remained a regular. In issue #40 (Sept. 1981), Abel returned with no further mention of Destiny.

A Secrets of Haunted House Special was published in 1978 as part of the DC Special Series umbrella title. Secrets of Haunted House was a temporary victim of the so-called "DC Implosion". With issue #14 (Oct.–Nov. 1978), it was cancelled but revived a year later with issue #15 (Aug. 1979). The title continued until issue #46 (March 1982).

The Mister E character was introduced in issue #31 (Dec. 1980) by writer Bob Rozakis and artist Dan Spiegle and became a recurring character for the next ten issues. The final Mister E story appeared in issue #41 (Oct. 1981).

The series' letter column was titled "The Haunted Mailbox".

Collected editions 
 The Steve Ditko Omnibus Volume 1 includes stories from Secrets of Haunted House #9, 12, 41, and 45, 480 pages, September 2011,

References

External links 

Secrets of Haunted House at Mike's Amazing World of Comics
 

1975 comics debuts
1978 comics endings
1979 comics debuts
1982 comics endings
Comics anthologies
Comics by Arnold Drake
Comics by David Michelinie
Comics by George Kashdan
Comics by J. M. DeMatteis
Comics by Paul Kupperberg
Comics by Steve Ditko
Comics magazines published in the United States
DC Comics one-shots
Defunct American comics
Fantasy comics